Grahan is an Indian Hindi crime drama streaming web television series created by Shailendra Kumar Jha and directed by Ranjan Chandel for Hotstar based on the book Chaurasi by Satya Vyas. The series stars Pawan Malhotra, Zoya Hussain, Anshumaan Pushkar and Wamiqa Gabbi. The series was premiered on Hotstar on June 24, 2021.

Overview 
Amrita Singh, a young IPS officer, resigns fed up with political interference at work, opting to marry her longstanding beau in Canada. That's when she learns that her father Gursevak Singh, a Sikh himself, is a prime accused of 1984 anti-Sikh riots in Bokaro, Jharkhand.

Amrita decides to stay on in the police force to unravel the truth. Through Amrita’s investigation emerges a tender love story of trust, betrayal and supreme sacrifice, where we see a beautiful old-world romance of Rishi and Manu, a Hindu boy and a Sikh girl in 1984. As the story progresses, secrets from the past about identities and relationships come tumbling out one after another, while at the social-political canvas the situations in 1984 and 2016 present some chilling and uncanny similarities too.

Cast 
 Pawan Malhotra as Gurusevak / Rishi Ranjan (older)
 Anshumaan Pushkar as Rishi Ranjan (younger)
 Zoya Hussain as SP Amrita Singh
 Wamiqa Gabbi as Manjeet Kaur Chhabra / Manu (younger)
Donny Kapoor as Manjeet Kaur Chhabra / Manu (older)
 Teekam Joshi as Sanjay Kumar Singh / Chunnu Babu
Sahidur Rahman as DSP Vikas Mandal
Abhinav Pateriya as Jaydev Agarwal / Jhandu
Namrata Varshney as Pragya (younger)
Shreedhar Dubey as Santosh and Suresh Jaiswal (double role)
Nandish Singh as Kartik
Sudhanva Deshpande as DIG Ramavtaar Keshari
Satyakam Anand as CM Kedar Bhagat 
Abhash Makharia as Suraj 
Abhishek Tripathi as SHO Batuk Singh
Sukhvinder Chahal as Mr. Chhabra, Manu's father
Aarya Sharma as Mrs. Chhabra, Manu's mother
Raj Sharma as Saini 
Anil Rastogi as Ramakant Thakur
Saharsh Kumar Shukla as Guru
Neelu Dogra as Pushpa Sanjay Singh
Vijay Shukla as Agarwal 
Anshuman Rawat as Adhikari
Bulloo Kumar as Kushal
Sachin Mishra as a Danga Informant
 Neelu Dogra as Pushpa Sanjay Singh
Purva Parag as older pragya
Akhilesh Yadav as rishi rioter
Rubina as defense lawyer assistant
Bilaal Ahmed as Danga terrace informant

Production 
The series marked the debut of Ranjan Chandel as the director, known for working on Mukkabaaz (2018) as co-writer and also made his directorial debut with Bamfaad (2020). It is based on the novel Chaurasi by Satya Vyas, which portrays the romantic relationship between two couples in the backdrop of 1984 anti-Sikh riots. Chandel stated that "I spend most of my time reading literature and poetry from all over the world and as a filmmaker, I want to tell stories of the characters who are rooted in Indian soil, and I connect with the stories where I find high emotional value." The pre-production for the series began in February 2020 but was put on hold due to COVID-19 pandemic lockdown in India in March 2020, which was resumed after the lockdown. The principal photography of the series started in September 2020 at Lucknow, Uttar Pradesh and filming completed on 4 December 2020.

Soundtrack 

The soundtrack for Grahan features four songs composed by Amit Trivedi and Daniel B. George, with lyrics written by Varun Grover and Swanand Kirkire.

Release 
Grahan was premiered on Disney+ Hotstar globally on June 24, 2021. The first trailer was released on June 10, 2021.

Reception 
Archika Khurana writing for The Times of India said, "Overall, 'Grahan' is an emotional tale that will leave you with a bag full of mixed emotions — love, hate, anguish, and betrayal. At times, it overwhelms too" and has rated 3.5 stars out of 5.

Shweta Keshri writing for India Today expressed, "the series might also interest the millennial kids in trying to find out about a forgotten chapter and one of the dark chapters of Indian history, which is not often talked about."
Sana Farzeen writing for The Indian Express said, "An impactful series that finds resonance in today’s India." Saibal Chatterjee writing for NDTV expressed, "Grahan, an essential cautionary tale, isn't eclipsed by its own unerringly earnest devices. Recommended for its humanist core."

Accolades

References

External links
 

2021 web series debuts
Indian web series
Hindi-language web series
Hindi-language Disney+ Hotstar original programming